The Olivetti M28 personal computer, introduced in 1986, was the successor to the Olivetti M24.
It had an Intel 80286 CPU running at 8 MHz and 512 KB (expandable to 1024 KB on the motherboard) of RAM, featuring a 5.25" floppy drive and a 20 MB hard drive. The operating systems were MS-DOS 3.2 and XENIX. 
The computer had room to install three disk units, as opposed to only two on the M24. It was possible to install a 70 MB hard drive, a 80287 math co-processor and a enhanced CGA compatible graphic card capable of displaying 640x400 pixels with 16 colors.

The Olivetti M28 was rebranded as the AT&T PC 6310 by AT&T in 1987 and sold on the US market.

It was available in France as the Persona 1800, sold by LogAbax.

See also 
 Olivetti M24

External links
  Brochure (in Italian)

References

Olivetti personal computers
Computer-related introductions in 1986